Legislative elections also known as Senatorial election for the Legislature of Guam were held on November 6, 2012, alongside a referendum on a for-profit bingo initiative. The Democratic Party won nine of the fifteen seats in the Legislature, whilst the referendum was rejected by 64.8% of voters.

Results

Legislature

Referendum

Candidates

Democratic

Republican

Eliminated
Elmore "Moe" Cotton

Primary Election
The members are elected at-large with the first 15 winning candidates are elected as the new members of the legislature. As there were many candidates running, primaries were set on September 1, 2012 for both the Democratic and Republican parties. The first fifteen candidates who win the highest votes go on to the General election.

Democratic Party Primary

Republican Party Primary

Eliminated candidates
On Republican is eliminated in the 2012 primaries:
 Elmore "Moe" Cotton

General election results
Following the primaries, there were 26 candidates vying for the 15 seats in the Legislature of Guam. The members are elected at-large with the first 15 winning candidates are elected as the new members of the legislature.

Incoming Senators to the 32nd Guam Legislature
There were 15 senators elected on November 6, 2012 to serve in the 32nd Guam Legislature and were inaugurated on January 7, 2013:

Democratic

Incumbents

Freshman

Republican

Incumbents

Freshman

References

2012 referendums
Referendums in Guam
 
2012 elections in Oceania